David Cowan (born 30 November 1910) was a Scottish footballer who played for Rochdale, Stenhousemuir, Falkirk, Arbroath and Dumbarton.

References

1910 births
Scottish footballers
Dumbarton F.C. players
Arbroath F.C. players
Falkirk F.C. players
Stenhousemuir F.C. players
Scottish Football League players
English Football League players
Date of death missing
Rochdale A.F.C. players
Association football inside forwards